The Witches Mountain (Spanish: El monte de las brujas) is a 1972 Spanish horror film directed by Raúl Artigot and starring Patty Shepard, Cihangir Ghaffari and Mónica Randall. A photographer takes an assignment in the Pyrenees just across the Spanish border, but soon has supernatural encounters.

Plot

Cast
 Patty Shepard as Delia
 Cihangir Ghaffari as Mario 
 Mónica Randall as Carla
 Guillermo Bredeston as Óscar
 Víctor Israel as Posadero
 Inés Morales as Mujer Gato
 Soledad Silveyra

Production

Release

Home media

References

Bibliography 
 Ness, Richard. From Headline Hunter to Superman: A Journalism Filmography. Scarecrow Press, 1997.

External links 
 

1972 films
1972 horror films
Spanish horror drama films
1970s Spanish-language films
Films about journalists
1970s Spanish films
Films about witchcraft
Films shot in Asturias
1970s rediscovered films
Rediscovered Spanish films
1972 directorial debut films